Meelis Atonen (born 5 December 1966 in Viljandi) is an Estonian politician and entrepreneur. He has been a member of the IX, X and XI Riigikogu representing the Estonian Reform Party. In 2003―2004, he was Minister of Economic Affairs and Communications.

References

Living people
1966 births
Estonian Reform Party politicians
Government ministers of Estonia
20th-century Estonian politicians
21st-century Estonian politicians
Members of the Riigikogu, 1999–2003
Members of the Riigikogu, 2003–2007
Members of the Riigikogu, 2007–2011
Estonian businesspeople
People from Viljandi